De vita et moribus philosophorum ('Lives and Manners of the Philosophers') is an anonymous Latin biographical dictionary of 132 ancient Greek and Roman philosophers and other luminaries from Thales of Miletus in the 6th century BC to Priscian in the 6th century AD. It was written in about 1317–1320 and draws heavily on Aristippus's Latin translation of the Greek Lives and Opinions of Eminent Philosophers of Diogenes Laertius. It was formerly attributed to Walter Burley, but is now recognized as anonymous. Its author may be known as "Pseudo-Walter Burley".

There are over 150 manuscript copies of De vita et moribus philosophorum, mostly from France and Italy. It was a popular early printed book, going through 30 editions by 1530. A Spanish translation was made in the early 15th century, an Italian translation by 1475 and three in Polish by the early 16th century.

De vita et moribus philosophorum was used as a source by Giovanni Colonna in his De viris illustribus begun in 1329.

Editions

Stigall, John Oliver H., ed. The 'De vita et moribus philosophorum' of Walter Burley: An Edition with Introduction. PhD diss. University of Colorado at Boulder, 1956. 
Crosas López, Francisco, ed. Vida y costumbres de los viejos filósofos : la traducción castellana cuatrocentista del De vita et moribus philosophorum atribuido a Walter Burley. Iberoamericana Editorial Vervuert, 2002.

Notes

Bibliography

Copeland, Rita. (2016) "Behind the Lives of Philosophers: Reading Diogenes Laertius in the Western Middle Ages." Interfaces: A Journal of Medieval European Literatures 3: 245–263.
Crosas López, Francisco. (2000) "Traducción castellana medieval del De vita et moribus philosophorum de Walter Burley." Rilce: Revista de Filología Hispánica 16(1): 38–45.
Ferrer Santanach, Montserrat. (2011) "Diogenes Laertius's Lives in the Fifteenth-Century Italian and Catalan Versions of Pseudo-Burley's Vita et moribus." Studi medievali 52(Fasc. 2): 681–695.
Grignaschi, Mario. (1990) "Lo pseudo Walter Burley e il Liber de vita et moribus philosophorum." Medioevo 16: 131–190.
Lutz, Cora E. (1972) "Walter Burley's De vita et moribus philosophorum." The Yale University Library Gazette 46(4): 247–252. 
Matthews, Alastair. (2010) "Literary Lives in Medieval Germany: The Wartburg Song Contest in Three Hagiographical Narratives." Deutsche  Vierteljahrsschrift für Literaturwissenschaft und Geistesgeschichte 84(1): 44–59. 
Surdich, Francesco (1982). "Colonna, Giovanni." Dizionario Biografico degli Italiani, Vol. 27. Istituto dell'Enciclopedia Italiana.

1310s books
Books about philosophers